The Eastern Orthodox Church presents a view of sin distinct from views found in Roman Catholicism and in Protestantism, that sin is viewed primarily as a terminal spiritual sickness, rather than a state of guilt, a self-perpetuating illness which distorts the whole human being and energies, corrupts the Image of God inherent in those who bear the human nature, diminishes the divine likeness within them, disorients their understanding of the world as it truly is, and distracts a person from fulfilling his natural potential to become deified in communion with God.

Overview
The Biblical Greek term for sin, αμαρτία (amartia), means "miss": it implies that one's aim is out and that one has not reached the goal, one's fullest potential. As in Western Christianity, in Eastern Orthodoxy the goal is union with God. Orthodoxy also understands sin as a disease of the soul, a condition where the soul is lacking in God's grace. Union with God, as made possible through Christ, is the ultimate medicine. Orthodoxy regards the mysteries of the Church, also known as sacraments in the West, as vehicles leading towards union with God.

View on sexuality

From the Orthodox churches point of view, humans are not sexual creatures in terms of their essential identity. To Eastern Orthodoxy, the relationship which people have with God is reflected in the love for one another; the union of two people in marriage is considered to be a reflection of our ultimate union with God. However, as a result of humanity's rebellion against God (the Fall), humanity has tended to adopt a more animalistic view of sexual activity which is not true to the ultimate transfigurable nature of the human race, having been made in the Divine image and likeness.

The Eastern Orthodox Church does not hold that sex is inherently sinful, but rather condemns seeing sex as something which can be divorced from the loving act between a married couple.  As St. Cesarios said, "copulation and birth of children in accordance with the law is free from any sin and condemnation."

Marriage
One of the Fathers of the Church, John Chrysostom, in elaborating on the words of Paul of Tarsus states that "because man is prone to strong lustful feelings, and because all men are not strong enough to be celibate, the Church allows the temporary union of marriage as an alternative to sin". This is a commentary on 1 Corinthians 7, which states "To the unmarried and the widows I say that it is well for them to remain unmarried as I am. But if they are not practicing self-control, they should marry. For it is better to marry than to be aflame with passion."

To some Orthodox, sex and marriage are both temporary states experienced in this world only. In Heaven all are equal and our relationship is with God (Gospel of Matthew 22:30, Gospel of Mark 12:25, Gospel of Luke 20:35). Other Orthodox regard marriage as being eternal, that the crowns used in the Orthodox marriage ceremony are received (as the rite states) into Heaven and therefore signify an eternal reality. Thus, while sexuality in its physical sense may not be continued in Heaven, the bond between a husband and wife is permanent, and celibacy, while an honourable and holy state if done for the sake of the Kingdom, is not by any means the most common path for all Orthodox Christians. With virginity, marriage is thus also understood as an ascetical working out of salvation. As the Bible says, the "marriage bed is undefiled" (Hebrews 13:4). As is seen in the sacramental rites themselves, marriage is understood as being forever sanctified by Christ's presence and first miracle at the wedding at Cana in Galilee (Gospel of John 2:1-11).

The Orthodox view Christian marriage as a primary image in the New Testament of the union of the Church with Christ. The eschatological fulfillment of all things is in terms of the marriage of the Bride to the Lamb (Revelation 19:7-9), i.e., the Church to Christ. "Thus, marriage is a sacrament—holy, blessed, and everlasting in the sight of God and His Church" (Orthodox Study Bible, p. 448). Or, as Fr. Alciviadis C. Calivas writes:

Orthodox theology has always presented Christian marriage as something absolutely unique, and, indeed eternal. In marriage, human love "is being projected into the Kingdom of God" (John Meyendorff), reflecting the intimate union between Christ and the faithful which St. Paul speaks of (Ephesians 5). Married life is a special vocation which requires the grace of the Holy Spirit; and it is this very grace which is conferred in the Marriage Service.

Fr. John Meyendorff in Byzantine Theology (pp. 196–197) says:
The Byzantine theological, liturgical, and canonical tradition unanimously stresses the absolute uniqueness of Christian marriage, and bases this emphasis upon the teaching of Ephesians 5. As a sacrament, or mysterion, marriage reflects the union between Christ and the Church, between Yahweh and Israel, and as such can be only one—an eternal bond, which death itself does not destroy. In its sacramental nature, marriage transfigures and transcends both fleshly union and contractual legal association: human love is being projected into the eternal Kingdom of God.

Only this basic understanding of Christian marriage can explain the fact that until the tenth century no second marriage, whether of those widowed or of those divorced, was blessed in church. Referring to the custom of "crowning" the bridal pair - a feature of the Byzantine rite of marriage—a canon attributed to Nicephorus the Confessor (806-815) specifies: "Those who enter a second marriage are not crowned and are not admitted to receive the most pure mysteries for two years; those who enter a third marriage are excommunicated for five years." This text, which merely repeats the earlier prescriptions of the canons of Basil, presupposes that second and third marriages of those widowed or divorced can be concluded as civil contracts only. Actually, since the marriage blessing was normally given at a Eucharist, where the bridal pair received communion, the required temporary excommunication excluded the Church's participation or blessing in cases when marriage was repeated.

Later Meyendorff also says:

The most striking difference between the Byzantine theology of marriage and its medieval Latin counterpart is that the Byzantines strongly emphasized the unicity of Christian marriage and the eternity of the marriage bond; they never considered that Christian marriage was a legal contract, automatically dissolved by the death of one of the partners.... Guided in its practice by the legal notion of contract, indissoluble as long as both parties were alive, the West seemed to ignore the idea that marriage, if it is a sacrament, has to be projected as an eternal bond into the Kingdom of God (ibid., pp. 198-199).

Homosexuality

The Orthodox Church has been consistent in condemning acts of homosexuality, despite variations in the conditions for homosexual activity and responses from various Church leaders and the State. Continuing a worldview evident from the Old and New Testaments, the Church Fathers consistently condemned homosexual activity, as did the Byzantine state.

Official statements by the Orthodox hierarchy continue to be consistent in terms of the traditional position that homosexual behaviour is sinful and thus damaging to the human person, and that homosexual temptation is a subject for ascetic struggle. While some Orthodox theologians and jurisdictions have championed the traditional view, they have also engaged in scientific conversation and in dialogue with the increasing number of societies that view homosexuality far differently than at the time of the Byzantine Empire. After affirming the import and meaning of the Scriptures that address homosexual activity, calling it sin, the Orthodox Church in America offered the following advice at its 10th All-American Council in 1992:

Men and women with homosexual feelings and emotions are to be treated with the understanding, acceptance, love, justice and mercy due to all human beings...Persons struggling with homosexuality who accept the Orthodox faith and strive to fulfill the Orthodox way of life may be communicants of the Church with everyone else who believes and struggles. Those instructed and counselled in Orthodox Christian doctrine and ascetical life who still want to justify their behavior may not participate in the Church’s sacramental mysteries, since to do so would not help, but harm them.

Assistance is to be given to those who deal with persons of homosexual orientation in order to help them with their thoughts, feelings and actions in regard to homosexuality. Such assistance is especially necessary for parents, relatives and friends of persons with homosexual tendencies and feelings. It is certainly necessary for pastors and church workers.

The Assembly of Canonical Orthodox Bishops of the United States of America, the highest representative body of Orthodox people in America, reaffirmed in a statement in September 2013 that "the Orthodox Christian teaching on marriage and sexuality, firmly grounded in Holy Scripture, two millennia of Church Tradition, and Canon Law, holds that the sacrament of marriage consists in the union of a man and a woman, and that authentic marriage reflects the sacred unity that exists between Christ and His Bride, the Church". "Acting upon any sexual attraction outside of sacramental marriage, whether the attraction is heterosexual or homosexual, alienates us from God". Moreover, the Assembly reminded that "persons with homosexual orientation are to be cared for with the same mercy and love that is bestowed on all of humanity by our Lord Jesus Christ".

Notes

External links
Celibacy, Marriage or "free love"... — Which way to choose? by Bishop Alexander (Mileant)
The Sacrament of Marriage: A commentary on the Orthodox marriage service
The Orthodox Christian Marriage: Part 1 by Fr. Alexey Young
The Orthodox Christian Marriage: Part 2 by Fr. Alexey Young
"The Homosexual Christian," by Fr. Thomas Hopko, The Orthodox Research Institute

Eastern Orthodox theology
LGBT and Eastern Orthodoxy